Middle Mountain Cabins are a set of three historic cabins located in the Monongahela National Forest near Wymer, Randolph County, West Virginia.  They were built in 1931, and consist of the Main Cabin and Cabins 1 and 2.  The Main Cabin is a one-story, rectangular, stained log building measuring approximately 22 feet by 20 feet.  It has a gable roof and full-length porch.  Cabins 1 and 2 are mirror-images of each other.  They are one-story, frame buildings with gable roofs measuring approximately 25 feet by 14 feet.  They were built to provide quarters for fire lookouts and to serve as a base for conducting other Forest Service operations.  They have since been converted for recreational use, and are available for rental as a group.

It was listed on the National Register of Historic Places in 1990.

References

Houses in Randolph County, West Virginia
Houses completed in 1931
Houses on the National Register of Historic Places in West Virginia
Monongahela National Forest
Rustic architecture in West Virginia
National Register of Historic Places in Randolph County, West Virginia
Log buildings and structures on the National Register of Historic Places in West Virginia